is a passenger railway station in located in the city of Yokkaichi,  Mie Prefecture, Japan, operated by the private railway operator Kintetsu Railway.

Lines
Sakura Station is a terminus of the Yunoyama Line, and is located 8.7 rail kilometers from the  opposing terminus of the line at Kintetsu-Yokkaichi Station.

Station layout
The station consists two opposed side platforms, one for each direction.  This makes it possible for trains running in opposite directions one the single-line Yunoyama Line to pass each other at this station.  There is a north and south entrance, and passengers going between the entrances and the platforms use an underground walkway.

Platforms

Adjacent stations

History
The station opened on June 1, 1913 as Sakuramura Station (桜村駅 Sakuramura-eki) on the Yokkaichi Railway. On March 1, 1931 it fell under the ownership of Mie Railway following a merger. The station was transferred to  Sanco following a merger in February 11, 1944. The station was renamed to Sakura Station on July 1, 1954. On February 1, 1964 the railway division of Sanco split off to form a separate company and the station came under the control of the Mie Electric Railway, which merged with Kintetsu on April 1, 1965. In the meantime, on March 1, 1964 during renovations on the line, station is moved about 0.2 km to the northeast. On August 28, 1999 - Underground walkway and Station-front park at the north exit were opened.

Passenger statistics
In fiscal 2019, the station was used by an average of 1911 passengers daily (boarding passengers only).

Surrounding area
West Yokkaichi High School
Japan National Route 477

See also
List of railway stations in Japan

References

External links

 Kintetsu: Sakura Station

Railway stations in Japan opened in 1913
Railway stations in Mie Prefecture
Stations of Kintetsu Railway
Yokkaichi